Friedrich Altemeier was a German fighter ace during World War I. While flying combat with Jagdstaffel 24 (Fighter Squadron 24), he scored 21 confirmed aerial victories between 3 March 1917 and 10 November 1918. Another two combat claims went unconfirmed.

List of victories

This list is complete for entries, though obviously not for all details. Information was abstracted from Above the Lines: The Aces and Fighter Units of the German Air Service, Naval Air Service and Flanders Marine Corps, 1914–1918, pp. 60–61, Norman Franks, Frank W. Bailey, Russell Guest. Grub Street, 1993.  and from The Aerodrome webpage on Friedrich Altemeier  Abbreviations from those sources were expanded by editor creating this list.

Aerial victories of Altemeier, Friedrich
Altemeier, Friedrich